Chlidanota thriambis is a species of moth of the family Tortricidae. It is found in Sri Lanka.

References

Moths described in 1906
Chlidanotini
Taxa named by Edward Meyrick